Blaine is an unincorporated community located in central Sunflower County, Mississippi.

Gallery

References

Unincorporated communities in Sunflower County, Mississippi
Unincorporated communities in Mississippi